Grigore Cobzac (born January 31, 1959 Hâncești, Moldavian SSR) is a politician from Moldova who since December 2014 has been deputy to the Parliament of the Republic of Moldova for the XXth legislature (2014-2018) in the faction of the Liberal Democratic Party of Moldova (LDPM). He is a member of the parliamentary commission for public administration, regional development, environment and climate change.

He was also a deputy in the previous legislature between 2010 and 2011, but after being elected president of the Hîncești District, he gave up the mandate of deputy.  

In the November 2014 parliamentary elections from the Republic of Moldova, he ran for 12th place on the list of candidates for the PLDM, thus obtaining the mandate of deputy in the Parliament of the Republic of Moldova in the XXth legislature.

After being elected again as a deputy in January 2015, he gave up the position of president of Hîncești District in favor of the deputy in Parliament.

References

External links 
 Site-ul Parlamentului Republicii Moldova
 Un deputat liberal democrat și-a dat demisia

1959 births
Living people
Liberal Democratic Party of Moldova MPs
Moldovan MPs 2010–2014